= Gudivakavaripalem =

Gudivakavaripalem is a small village in Avanigaddda mandal, Krishna District, Andhra Pradesh, India. It consists of 400 people, the majority of whom depend on agriculture for their livelihood.

The pincode of Gudivakavaripalem is 521122.
